Grad Damen (born 14 August 1997) is a Dutch professional footballer who plays as a midfielder.

Club career
Damen joined NAC's youth set-up in 2006 from Sint Anna Boys. He made his professional debut on 23 October 2015 against Sparta. In 2019, his contract at NAC Breda was at the last moment not renewed, resulting in a brief lull in his professional football career.

On 14 January 2020, Damen joined TOP Oss on an amateur contract. After making a good impression, he signed a two-year professional contract six months later. Damen missed almost the entire 2020–21 season due to an injury. On 6 August 2021, he made his comeback in the season opener against Excelsior.

Damen joined Derde Divisie club ASWH on 1 September 2022, leaving the club in the winter break.

Personal life
His grandfather Grad "Gerrie" Damen also played professionally for NAC. Cousin Grad is a well-known Dutch singer.

References

External links
 

1997 births
Living people
Dutch footballers
NAC Breda players
Helmond Sport players
TOP Oss players
ASWH players
Eredivisie players
Eerste Divisie players
Derde Divisie players
Association football midfielders
Footballers from Breda